ICBM (intercontinental ballistic missile) address or missile address is hacker slang for one's longitude and latitude (preferably to seconds-of-arc accuracy) when placed in a signature or another publicly available file.

Origin 
The form that used to register a site with the Usenet mapping project, before Internet connectivity became commonplace for Usenet sites, included a field for longitude and latitude, preferably to seconds-of-arc accuracy.  This was actually used for generating geographically-correct maps of Usenet links on a plotter; however, it became traditional to refer to this as one's ICBM address or missile address, and some people include it in their sig block with that name.

A typical tag might read "ICBM Address: 36.8274040 N, 108.0204086 W".

Modern use 
Today, using the ICBM method of coordinates is one method of geotagging webpages or other online material.  Some projects parse ICBM address included in webpages via meta tags, which can then be used to map out sites added to its database.

Web page uses of <meta name="ICBM" content="12.345, 67.890"> specify the same location as a geo:12.345,67.890 URI.

See also 
 Geo URI scheme (the correct Internet standard)
 Schema.org (schema.org/geo the standard for HTML)
Geographic coordinate system
LOC record
Geo (microformat)
Geotagging

References

External links 
Jargon File ICBM Address Entry

Internet slang
Intercontinental ballistic missiles
Metaphors referring to war and violence
Metaphors referring to objects